The 2020–21 Rayo Vallecano season was the club's 96th season in existence and the second consecutive season in the second division of Spanish football. In addition to the domestic league, Rayo Vallecano participated in this season's edition of the Copa del Rey. The season covered the period from 21 July 2020 to 30 June 2021.

Players

First-team squad

Reserve team

Out on loan

Pre-season and friendlies

Competitions

Overview

Segunda División

League table

Results summary

Results by round

Matches
The league fixtures were announced on 31 August 2020.

Promotion play-offs

Copa del Rey

Statistics

Appearances and goals
Last updated on 8 March 2021.

|-
! colspan=14 style=background:#dcdcdc; text-align:center|Goalkeepers

|-
! colspan=14 style=background:#dcdcdc; text-align:center|Defenders

|-
! colspan=14 style=background:#dcdcdc; text-align:center|Midfielders

|-
! colspan=14 style=background:#dcdcdc; text-align:center|Forwards

|-
! colspan=14 style=background:#dcdcdc; text-align:center|Players who have made an appearance this season but have left the club
|-
|}

Notes

References

External links

Rayo Vallecano seasons
Rayo Vallecano